Frederick Hulme may refer to:

 Frederick Edward Hulme (1841–1909), teacher and amateur botanist
 Frederick William Hulme (1816–1884), English landscape painter and illustrator

See also
 Fred Hulme, rugby league footballer of the 1950s